"Once Upon a Christmas Song" is a Christmas single, and the second single to be released by fictional character Geraldine McQueen. It was co-written by Gary Barlow and Peter Kay who plays the character, originating from a parody talent show called Britain's Got the Pop Factor.... The song was a major success, reaching number 5 in the Official Charts for the United Kingdom. The CD was released on 15 December 2008, with the download available a day earlier and the proceeds going to the NSPCC, a British charity working and campaigning on child protection.
In 2016, an instrumental version of the song served as the theme tune to BBC One's compilation series Peter Kay's Comedy Shuffle.

Video
The video for "Once Upon A Christmas Song" features Geraldine (Peter Kay), on a float singing to the public. It ends with her lighting up a street with Christmas decorations. Also, Jackie (Jo Enright) and Wendy (Sian Foulkes) from 2 Up 2 Down feature. ITV News Granada presenter and reporter Lucy Meacock, from the North West ITV regional news programme Granada Reports/Granada Tonight, makes a speaking cameo as herself.

Track listing
For the CD release of Once Upon A Christmas Song, tracks featured are;
Once Upon A Christmas Song
The Winners Song
Geraldine's Medley

Charts

Weekly charts

Year-end charts

References

External links

2008 singles
Songs written by Gary Barlow
2008 songs
British Christmas songs
Comedy songs